Chameleon II: Death Match is a 1999 science fiction action television movie, starring Bobbie Phillips. It was written by Bennett Cohen and directed by Craig R. Baxley and Russell King. The film is part of a trilogy. It is a sequel to the 1998 film Chameleon and was followed by a second sequel, Chameleon 3: Dark Angel. Chameleon II was first aired on October 15, 1999 on UPN.

Plot
Kam (Bobbie Phillips), a genetically altered agent, is called back to action when the clientele of a luxury casino is taken hostage by an audacious criminal.

Cast
 Bobbie Phillips as Kam
 Casey Siemaszko as Jake Booker
 Tasha Smith as Webster, IBI Director
 Kara Zediker as Nicky Quade
 Jerome Ehlers as Erickson
 John Waters as Henry Kubica
 Simon Westaway as Reynard Lulac
 Mark Lee as Steven Myers
 Rhondda Findleton as Eva
 Nique Needles as Oscar
 Robert Coleby as Brandford
 Damian De Montemas as Lenz
 Josh Quong Tart as Connor
 Julian Garner as Dekker
 Scott McLean as Bennet, Nicky’s partner 
 Donald Battee as HUGH

Reception
Robert Pardi from TV Guide gave the film two out of four stars and wrote: "Why doesn't someone cast B-movie icon Bobbie Phillips in a top-of-the-line movie? She's this Die Hard rip-off's most attractive selling point, and a fine advertisement for genetic reconfiguring". Jim McLennan from "Girls with Guns" did liked the film and wrote: "Overall, this is a poor follow-up. You shouldn’t try to remake classics, unless you can bring something new to the party, and while Phillips is certainly no worse an actor than Bruce Willis, it’s not enough to stop this seeming a lame copy".

See also
 List of television films produced for UPN

References

External links
 
 

1999 television films
1999 films
1999 action films
1999 science fiction films
1990s American films
1990s English-language films
1990s science fiction action films
Action television films
American science fiction action films
American science fiction television films
American sequel films
Films directed by Craig R. Baxley
Films scored by Roger Neill
Television sequel films
UPN original films